Fred Fox (22 January 1884 – 1 December 1949) was an English assistant director and film actor. He appeared in 12 films between 1943 and 1949. He won an Academy Award in 1933 for Best Assistant Director.

He was born in Highworth, Swindon, Wiltshire and died in Los Angeles, California from a heart attack.

References

External links

1884 births
1949 deaths
English male film actors
English male silent film actors
English film directors
Best Assistant Director Academy Award winners
People from Highworth
20th-century English male actors